Mr. Whippy Australia is a franchise of ice-cream vendors operating in Australia.

History
The original Mr. Whippy in the United Kingdom franchised internationally to Australia in 1962 by sending ten vans on a ship from Southampton to Sydney, following success, a second batch was set the year after, consisting of twenty-four vans. The company's franchise in Australia continued until the mid-1970s, after which the physical vehicle fleet was sold to private operators. During the franchise period from Mr. Whippy in the UK, around 200 Commer Karrier vans were imported from the UK to Australia.

In 1982, the trademark "Mr Whippy" was registered in Australia by ice cream parlour company Mr Whippy Pty Ltd. Today, the Franchised Food Company owns the brand.

See also

References

External links
 (Australia)

Australian companies established in 1962
Manufacturing companies established in 1962
Retail companies established in 1962
Dairy products companies of Australia
Manufacturing companies based in Melbourne
Ice cream brands
Ice cream vans